KYAL (1550 AM) is a sports-formatted radio station in Tulsa, Oklahoma and licensed to serve Sapulpa, Oklahoma. The station is owned by Michael Perry Stephens. Its studios are located at the CityPlex Towers in South Tulsa.

History
KYAL's format history includes Urban Contemporary as KXOJ in the 1980s targeting Tulsa, later changing its call letters to KBLK as "Power 1550". It was a simulcast of the Urban format from a cable radio station called "Radiovision" that aired on Tulsa Cable's Wanted Ads channel at the time and also bought time on 1550 to broadcast its station. The 1550 signal did not cover Tulsa very well, being that the transmitter was in Sapulpa, Oklahoma and was only 500 watts at the time and was also a daytimer. By the late 1980s–early 1990s, the station upgraded its power to 2,500 watts in the day and 47 watts at night (still not enough to cover all of Tulsa at night), giving the station the permission to broadcast 24 hours with its Urban format.

By the early 1990s, the lease was not renewed for Radiovision to broadcast on 1550, and the Urban format was dropped along with Radiovision, shutting down its operation. KBLK flipped to a religious radio format and the call letters back to KXOJ, it briefly simulcasted Contemporary Christian with FM sister station KXOJ-FM and later aired a Southern Gospel format. In 2002, Southern Gospel was dropped for a sports format as "ESPN Radio" simulcasting with KWPN in Oklahoma City.

Translators

External links
KYAL official website
Radiovision Article In Billboard Magazine From March 26,1983

YAL
Sports radio stations in the United States